Ons Jabeur was the defending champion, but chose to participate in Rosmalen instead.

Magda Linette won the title, defeating Zarina Diyas in the final, 7–6(7–1), 2–6, 6–3.

Seeds

Draw

Finals

Top half

Bottom half

References

Main Draw

Manchester Trophy - Singles